IFDA may refer to:
 International Foodservice Distributors Association
 Iranian Food & Drug Administration
 Irish Flying Disc Association, the Irish Ultimate frisbee league
International Furnishings and Design Association
International Foundation for Development Alternatives, a Swiss NGO from 1976 to the early 90s
 The associations for funeral directors in Illinois, Indiana, and Iowa.